A riding mower, also known as a ride-on mower, tractor mower or lawn tractor, is a type of lawn mower on which the operator is seated, unlike mowers which are pushed or towed.

Riding mowers, which sometimes resemble small tractors, are larger than push mowers and are suitable for large lawns, although commercial riding lawn mowers (such as zero-turn mowers) can be "stand-on" types, and often bear little resemblance to residential lawn tractors, being designed to mow large areas at high speed in the shortest time possible. The largest multi-gang (multi-blade) mowers are mounted on tractors and are designed for large expanses of grass such as golf courses and municipal parks, although they are ill-suited for complex terrain requiring maneuverability.

Persons using a mower should wear heavy footwear, eye protection, and hearing protection in the case of engine-powered mowers.

The American Academy of Pediatrics recommends that children be at least 12 years old before they are allowed to use a walk-behind lawn mower and at least 16 years of age before using a riding mower. They also should demonstrate proper judgement and maturity.

Most commonly, riding mowers use gasoline engines rather than electricity as a source of energy, though some companies have begun to produce models that are fully electric.

References

Further reading
Virtual boundaries
Rasentraktor Test (in German)

Lawn mowers
Vehicles by purpose